Deadlock is a 1943 British crime film starring John Slater in a dual role as twin brothers. A quota quickie, it was listed on the British Film Institute's BFI 75 Most Wanted list of lost films; as a result, it was rediscovered.

Cast
John Slater as Fred Bamber / Allan Bamber
Cecile Chevreau as Eileen
Molly Hamley-Clifford as Martha
Hugh Morton as Arkell
Gordon Edwards as Geoffrey
Mirren Wood as a village girl
Richard Lindsay as the judge
George Dewhurst as Slaks

References

External links
BFI 75 Most Wanted entry, with extensive notes

British crime films
British black-and-white films
1943 crime films
1943 films
1940s rediscovered films
Rediscovered British films
1940s British films